Paranataelia is a genus of moths of the family Noctuidae.

Species
 Paranataelia tenerifica (Hampson, 1906)
 Paranataelia whitei (Rebel, 1906)

References
Natural History Museum Lepidoptera genus database
Paranataelia at funet

Hadeninae